Ganapati also written as Ganapathi is a rāgam in Carnatic music (musical scale of South Indian classical music) created by M. Balamuralikrishna with only three notes and Introduced to Carnatic music with a composition 'Gam Ganapathim'. It is a janya rāga (derived scale) of the 1st Melakarta rāgam Kanakangi.

Scale 

The Ganapati raga contains three notes in ascending and descending of the scale:

 Arohana : 
 Avarohana :

Compositions

Notes

References 

Janya ragas